Roy Eugene Davis (March 9, 1931 – March 27, 2019) was an American spiritual teacher and author who "established the Georgia-based Center for Spiritual Awareness in 1972". Previously he had founded New Life Worldwide Inc. In 1967, he began publishing Truth Journal Magazine which has now been in continuous publication for 44 years. By 1970 he had authored nine books. Davis continued to teach in the Kriya Yoga tradition for more than 60 years.

Biography
Born in Leavittsburg, Ohio, Davis became interested in yoga at a young age. He read the book Autobiography of a Yogi when he was 18 and was attracted to kriya yoga and the author, Paramahansa Yogananda, who he "knew was his guru". After studying lessons from Yogananda's Self-Realization Fellowship and graduating from high school, he met Yogananda in 1949 and joined the monastic students at Yogananda's Self-Realization Fellowship. In 1951, he was ordained by Paramahansa Yogananda. In 1952, he was "appointed Minister of the SRF Center in Phoenix, Arizona", teaching kriya yoga.

He left Self-Realization Fellowship and served in the United States Army Medical Corps at Fort Riley from 1953 through 1955. Following his military duty, he began his ministry as an independent spiritual teacher. In the 1960s he founded New Life Worldwide. He began publishing the Truth Journal magazine in 1967. In the early 1970s, Edwin O'Neal of the Christian Spiritual Alliance invited Davis to head the organizations teaching ministry, and they named this outreach "Center for Spiritual Awareness". In 1972 Davis moved from Florida to Lakemont, Georgia to develop the ministry and retreat facilities of Center for Spiritual Awareness. Davis was in 1976 elected chairman of Christian Spiritual Alliance after O'Neal retired.

Davis taught in more than 100 cities in North America and in Japan, Brazil, Europe, West Africa, and India. Some of his books are published in 10 languages and in 11 countries. He continued to publish Truth Journal magazine and wrote monthly lessons for the Christian Spiritual Alliance members around the world.

He died on March 27, 2019, at the age of 88.

Bibliography

References

Further reading

1931 births
2019 deaths
Devotees of Paramahansa Yogananda
American yoga teachers
American yogis
American spiritualists
American spiritual writers
United States Army soldiers
Writers about religion and science